XHATM-FM is a radio station on 105.1 FM in Morelia, Michoacán. It is owned by Cadena RASA and carries Radio Fórmula programming.

History
XECGP-AM 1520, a 500-watt daytimer received its concession on August 7, 1978. By the 1990s, the station was on 990 kHz as XEATM-AM, a callsign reflecting its format and name at the time, A Toda Máquina.

XEATM was cleared to move to FM in 2011.

References

Radio stations in Michoacán